Herman Haupt (March 26, 1817 – December 14, 1905) was an American civil engineer and railroad construction engineer and executive. As a Union Army General during the American Civil War, he revolutionized U.S. military transportation, particularly the use of railroads.

Early and family life

Haupt (whose first name was sometimes spelled Hermann) was born in Philadelphia, Pennsylvania, on March 26, 1817, the son of Jacob and Anna Margaretta Wiall Haupt. Jacob, a merchant, died when Herman was 12 years old, leaving Anna to support three sons and two daughters. Herman worked part-time to pay his school tuition, then in 1831 was appointed to the United States Military Academy at the age of 14 by President Andrew Jackson. He graduated in 1835 and was commissioned a second lieutenant in the 3rd U.S. Infantry that July.

On August 30, 1838, in Gettysburg, Pennsylvania, he married Ann Cecelia (Celia) Keller, with whom he would have seven sons and four daughters. In the 1870 census, Louis, Herman, Charles, Frank and Alex were living at home with their parents in Philadelphia's Ward 10, as were their sisters Mary and Ella.

Early career

Haupt resigned his Army commission on September 30, 1835, to accept a job under Henry R Campbell as Assistant Engineer engaged in the surveys of the Norristown and Allentown Railroad and of the Norristown & Valley Railroad, 15 years later merged into the Chester Valley Railroad. At 19, he was appointed Assistant Engineer in the state service and surveyed the line from Gettysburg to the Potomac across the South Mountain, a right-of-way that became part of the Western Maryland Railroad.

In 1839, Haupt patented a bridge construction technique called the Haupt Truss. Two of his Haupt truss bridges, both built in 1854, still stand in Altoona and Ardmore, Pennsylvania.

In 1840, Haupt was appointed a professor of mathematics and engineering at Pennsylvania College (now Gettysburg College). He drew the attention of J. Edgar Thomson who became chief engineer of the Pennsylvania Railroad. Haupt returned to the railroad business in 1847, accepting a position as construction engineer on the Pennsylvania Railroad, then becoming its general superintendent from 1849 to 1851. Haupt and Thomson designed the Horseshoe Curve (now a National Historic Landmark) which enabled the Pennsylvania Railroad to cross the Allegheny Mountains and reach Pittsburgh, Pennsylvania.

From 1851 until 1853, Haupt was the chief engineer of the Southern Railroad of Mississippi, then became the Pennsylvania Railroad's chief engineer until 1856; in the latter position he completed the Mountain Division with the Allegheny Tunnel, opening the line through to Pittsburgh. He was the chief engineer on the five-mile (8 km) Hoosac Tunnel project through the Berkshires in Western Massachusetts from 1856 to 1861.

He was elected as a member to the American Philosophical Society in 1871.

Civil War

In the spring of 1862, a year after the start of the Civil War, the U.S. War Department organized a new bureau responsible for constructing and operating military railroads in the United States. On April 27, Haupt was appointed chief of the bureau by Secretary of War Edwin M. Stanton, as a colonel and aide-de-camp to major general Irvin McDowell, then in command of the defenses of Washington, D.C. Haupt repaired and fortified war-damaged railroad lines in the vicinity of Washington, armed and trained railroad staff, and improved telegraph communications along the railroad lines. Among his most challenging assignments was restoring the strategic Richmond, Fredericksburg and Potomac Railroad line, including the Potomac Creek Bridge, after its partial destruction by Confederate forces. Despite an inexperienced workforce and other serious impediments, Haupt had the line back in use in under two weeks. President Abraham Lincoln was impressed with Haupt's work there. In a visit on May 28, 1862, he observed: "That man Haupt has built a bridge four hundred feet long and one hundred feet high, across Potomac Creek, on which loaded trains are passing every hour, and upon my word, gentlemen, there is nothing in it but cornstalks and beanpoles."

Haupt was promoted to brigadier general of volunteers on September 5, 1862, but he initially refused the appointment, explaining that he would be happy to serve without official rank or pay, but he did not want to limit his freedom to work in private business – and he privately bridled at the protocols and discipline of Army service. He worked with Gen. Daniel McCallum, a fellow railroad man and later became good friends with John H. Devereux, the Superintendent of the United States Military Railroad at Alexandria, Virginia and later General Superintendent of the Cleveland & Pittsburgh Railroad. However, he chafed at dealing with other Union army commanders. He also preferred civilian crews, including those consisting of former slaves ("contraband negroes"), to military ones. His Construction Corps had 300 men divided into 10-man squads by June 1862, and was later enlarged to include bridge-builders, then construction of freight cars, barracks, wharves, warehouses, etcetera.  Its range of operation was extended to Tennessee and it accompanied Sherman's thrust through Georgia under the direction of Colonel William Wierman Wright and division engineer Eben C. Smeed.

Haupt also experimented with bridge demolition using "torpedoes", as mines were called at the time, inserted in holes drilled in trusses. He also discussed in a November 1862 report various methods of destroying locomotives, determining that firing a cannon ball through the boiler rendered it irreparable, while locomotives with fireboxes drained then fired could be repaired. He also tested a lightweight 2-clamp "rail-twister" invented by his subordinate Eben C. Smeed, for use in raids behind enemy lines.

Offered promotion again in early autumn 1863, Haupt hinged his acceptance on three conditions: that a central Bureau of U.S. Military Railroads be established to inspect, direct, and receive reports concerning construction and operation of all military railroads; difficulties with commanding generals be avoided through consultation and cooperation within their departments; the chief of the bureau should be free to move wherever his personal presence was necessary or to attend to whatever public or private business required his attention. The War Department declined to accept his terms. Haupt's appointment was eventually rescinded on September 5, 1863, and he left the service on September 14. 

During his year as a general, however, he made an enormous impact on the Union war effort. The Civil War was one of the first wars in which large-scale railroad transportation was used to move and supply armies rapidly over long distances. Haupt assisted the Union Army of Virginia and Army of the Potomac in the Northern Virginia Campaign, the Maryland Campaign, and was particularly effective in supporting the Gettysburg Campaign, conducted in an area he knew well from his youth. His hastily organized trains kept the Union Army well supplied, and he organized the returning trains to carry thousands of Union wounded to hospitals. After the Battle of Gettysburg, Haupt boarded one of his trains and arrived at the White House on July 6, 1863, becoming the first to inform President Lincoln that General Robert E. Lee's defeated Confederate army was not being pursued vigorously by Union Major General George G. Meade.

During his service, Haupt developed and implemented "general principles of railroad supply operation" and "also detailed methods of construction and destruction of railroad equipment". His two main principles were that the military should never interfere with the efficient running of the railroad and that rolling stock should be emptied and returned promptly to enable their re-use as transport.

Postbellum
After his war service, Haupt returned to railroad, bridge, pipeline, and tunnel construction. He worked with the Richmond and Danville Railroad then was the general manager of Piedmont Air-Line Railway (from Richmond, Virginia, to Atlanta, Georgia), 1872 to 1876; Tide Water Pipe Line Company, 1875- ; general manager of the transcontinental Northern Pacific Railroad, 1881 to 1885; president of the Dakota and Great Southern Railroad, 1885 to 1886.

Haupt became wealthy from investments in railroads, mining, and Pennsylvania real estate, but eventually lost most of his fortune, in part due to political complications involving the completion of the Hoosac Tunnel. He and his wife purchased a small resort hotel at Mountain Lake in Giles County, Virginia. He invented a drilling machine that won the highest prize of the Royal Polytechnic Society of Great Britain and was the first to prove the practicability of transporting oil in pipes.

Haupt also authored several papers and books: Hints on Bridge Building (1840), The General Theory of Bridge Construction (1851), Plan for the Improvement of the Ohio River (1855), Military Bridges (1864) and Reminiscences (1901).

Death and legacy

Haupt died of a heart attack at age 88 in Jersey City, New Jersey, stricken while traveling on the Pennsylvania Railroad in a Pullman car named "Irma" on a journey from New York to Philadelphia. He is buried in West Laurel Hill Cemetery in Bala Cynwyd, Pennsylvania. His son Lewis M. Haupt was a noted civil engineer and professor.

Selected works
 Hints on Bridge Building, published in 1840
 General Theory of Bridge Construction, 1851
 Plan for Improvement of the Ohio River, 1855
  Military Bridges, 1864
 Report upon the System of the Holly Steam Combination Co. Ltd., 1879
  Reminiscences of General Herman Haupt Wright & Joys, 1901 - United States - 331 pages

In popular culture
Haupt is a character in the alternate history novels Gettysburg: A Novel of the Civil War and  Grant Comes East by Newt Gingrich and William R. Forstchen.
Haupt also appears in the TV miniseries The Blue and the Gray by Walter Brooke.

See also

List of American Civil War generals (Union)
United States Military Railroad

References
Notes

Bibliography
 Abdill, George B. (1961) Civil War Railroads: A Pictorial Story of the War Between the States, 1861-1865  Bloomington, Indiana: Indiana University Press.
 Eicher, John H., and Eicher, David J. (2001) Civil War High Commands. Stanford, California: Stanford University Press. 
 Haupt online biography

Further reading
 Frey, Robert L., ed. (1988) Railroads in the Nineteenth Century. Encyclopedia of American Business History and Biography series. New York: Facts on File. 
 Gingrich, Newt, and Forstchen, William R. (2003) Gettysburg: A Novel of the Civil War. New York: St. Martin's Press. . This alternate history novel (and its sequel, Grant Comes East) is one of the few popular books related to the war to acknowledge the importance of Haupt's contributions.
 Ward, James A. (1973) That Man Haupt: A Biography of Herman Haupt. Baton Rouge: Louisiana State University Press.

External links

Herman Haupt Bridge
Biography at West Laurel Hill Cemetery web site
 about Haupt's early days in Gettysburg

 
Herman Haupt papers (MS 269). Manuscripts and Archives, Yale University Library.

1817 births
1905 deaths
Union Army generals
United States Military Academy alumni
American railroad pioneers
American railway civil engineers
Northern Pacific Railway people
People of Pennsylvania in the American Civil War
Gettysburg College faculty
Military personnel from Philadelphia
Burials at West Laurel Hill Cemetery
Engineers from Pennsylvania